The Friends of Snakes Society is an Indian non-profit organisation dedicated to the protection of, and public education about, snakes. It was founded and registered under Society Registration Act in the year 1995 by Late Shri. Rajkumar Kanuri. With the help of Andhra Pradesh Forest Department, the Friends of Snakes Society has been rescuing snakes that enter human habitation and relocating them. The organisation also conducts awareness programs to spread awareness about these gravely misunderstood creatures, eradicating age old myths and misconceptions about them. The organisation regularly conducts awareness programmes in schools, colleges, public and private institutions, community centers etc.

Chief objectives

The chief objectives of the Friends of Snakes Society include:

Conservation and protection of snakes.
Education and awareness generation of snakes eradicating myths & misconceptions about them. Snake bite information & effective remedies and proper treatment procedures.
Establishment of a snake conservation center which will be part of the upcoming Herpeto-Park in Hyderabad.
Research and development studies pertaining to snakes of India.
Cease snake skin trade and end poaching.

Recent Recognitions

 Chaitanya's Sevaa Dharmik Award was presented to Friends of Snakes Society in 2012 by Chaitanya Art Theaters for selfless service to the society.
 A title of Jeeva Vyvidhya Rakshak was conferred to Friends of Snakes Society on 22 May 2012, by AP State Biodiversity Board and CEFNARM for relentless efforts in conserving biodiversity.

References

 Official Friends of Snakes Society website 
 Hyderabad Zoo: Friends of Snakes Society
  Fullhyderabad.com: Friends of Snakes Society
  Betterindia.com: Friends of Snakes
   Hindu.com: Friends of Snakes]
  Times of India.com: "Snakes club"]
   Bevinindia.wordpress.com: Friends of Snakes
 Cluburb.com: Friends of Snakes in Hyderabad
 Snake Rescue HelpLine # +91 8374233366

Snakes
Reptile conservation organizations
Nature conservation organisations based in India
Organisations based in Hyderabad, India
Reptiles of India
Snakes in popular culture
Snakes of Asia
Environment of Telangana
Environmental organizations established in 1995
1995 establishments in Andhra Pradesh